Tim Duckworth (born September 14, 1982) is a former American football guard.  He was signed by the Denver Broncos as an undrafted free agent in 2007. He played college football at Auburn.

Duckworth has also been a member of the New Orleans Saints, Philadelphia Eagles and Carolina Panthers of the National Football League.

Duckworth was a member of the Saints practice squad during their 2007 and 2008 seasons, and then after a 2008 post-season stint on the Eagles practice squad, he rejoined the Saints practice squad for their Super Bowl-winning 2009 season. Duckworth was released by the Saints on August 24, 2010.  He signed with Carolina on August 30, 2010.  On October 10, 2010, Duckworth was released by the Panthers.

References

External links
 Auburn Tigers bio
 Carolina Panthers bio

1982 births
Living people
People from Taylorsville, Mississippi
American football offensive guards
Auburn Tigers football players
Denver Broncos players
New Orleans Saints players
Philadelphia Eagles players
Carolina Panthers players
Las Vegas Locomotives players